Jürgen Reents (5 August 1949 – 7 April 2022) was a German politician and journalist.

Early life and education
Reents was born in 1949 in the West German city of Bremerhaven and studied math at the University of Hamburg.

Political career
Reents entered the newly founded Greens and was a member of the Bundestag, the German federal diet from 1983 to 1985.

When, on 18 October 1984, President of the Bundestag Richard Stücklen excluded Reents from the session for calling Chancellor Helmut Kohl "bought by Flick", Christa Nickels requested an interruption. Stücklen turned her microphone off, which prompted Joschka Fischer to address him, "With respect, Mr. President, you are an asshole", for which he in turn was excluded by Stücklen. Fischer apologized to Stücklen two days later.

References

 

1949 births
2022 deaths
German journalists
Members of the Bundestag for Alliance 90/The Greens
Party of Democratic Socialism (Germany) politicians
The Left (Germany) politicians
Members of the Bundestag for Hamburg
University of Hamburg alumni
People from Bremerhaven